The 12383 / 84 Sealdah - Asansol Junction Intercity Express is a Express train belonging to Indian Railways Eastern Railway zone that runs between  and  in India.

Coaches
The 12383 / 84 Sealdah - Asansol Junction Intercity Express has  one Non AC chair car, 10 general unreserved & two SLR (seating with luggage rake) coaches . It does not carry a pantry car coach.

As is customary with most train services in India, coach composition may be amended at the discretion of Indian Railways depending on demand.

Service

Routing

Traction
As the route is electrified, a  based WAG-5 Electric locomotive pulls the train to its destination.

References

External links
12383 Intercity Express at India Rail Info
12384 Intercity Express at India Rail Info

Intercity Express (Indian Railways) trains
Transport in Kolkata
Rail transport in West Bengal
Transport in Asansol